Sheikh Abbas Ali Akhtari (7 December 1939 – 31 October 2022) was an Iranian Ayatollah. He represented the Supreme Leader of Iran in Semnan province, while also serving as the Imam of Friday Prayer in Semnan. He also represented the people in Khorasan province in the early 80's for the first term of the Islamic Consultative Assembly (Iranian Parliament). He later represented the people of Tehran province for the seventh term of the Iranian Parliament. He was a member of Assembly of Experts, from February 2021 to October 2022 in the fifth term of the Assembly of Experts, after the death of Nasrallah Shah-Abadi. He was elected in the first midterm elections of the Assembly of Experts on 23 February 2020.

Biography 
Abbas Ali Akhtari was born on 7 December 1939 in Sorkheh. After obtaining his diploma in school in his hometown, he went to Mashhad to attend the Hawza there. He stayed there for around 20 years, before leaving to Qom to attend advanced classes in Islamic studies in Qom Seminary, as well as teach there. He had been in trouble with SAVAK before the Iranian Revolution, he was arrested for making anti-Shah speeches. He served the Iranian military service alongside Akbar Hashemi Rafsanjani. After the revolution, he was chosen by Ruhollah Khomeini to represent him in Semnan province, as well as leading the prayers in Semnan. He resigned from these posts in 2001, and Seyed Mohammad Shahcheraghi was chosen by Ali Khamenei to replace him. He served two terms in the Iranian Parliament. He was unsuccessful in the 2016 Iranian Assembly of Experts election, however, was elected in the midterm elections in 2020 replacing Nasrallah Shah-Abadi.

Works 

Abbas Ali Akhtari has published several works throughout his life. Here are some of them.

 Familiarity with the Quran
 Toli and Tabari
 Young People at a Crossroads
 The Manifestations of Wisdom in the Words of the Infallibles (peace be upon them)
 Imams and Revival of the Values of the Islamic Revolution

See also 

 List of Ayatollahs
 List of members in the Fifth Term of the Council of Experts
 List of provincial representatives appointed by Supreme Leader of Iran
 List of Iran's parliament representatives (7th term)
 Mohammad Shahcheraghi

References 

1939 births
2022 deaths
Iranian politicians
People from Semnan Province
Members of the Assembly of Experts
Members of the Islamic Consultative Assembly
Iranian ayatollahs
Shia clerics